Canada Lake is a lake located in the Town of Caroga in Fulton County in the U.S. State of New York. Unlike the nearby Caroga lakes, Canada Lake is very deep which provides colder water for species such as trout to survive. There is an annual draw down on the lake by way of a control structure on the outlet of Stewart Landing. The impoundment of this water has created a lake complex of Lily Lake, Canada Lake, West Lake and Green Lake.

Fishing 

Fish found within this lake include brown trout, brown bullhead, lake trout, chain pickerel, smallmouth bass, lake whitefish, yellow perch and pumpkinseed. Canada Lake has excellent fishing for both brown trout and lake trout in the deeper parts of the lake. Smallmouth bass can be found along the rocky shores of Canada Lake.

History 

The lake's north shore road was built in the 1840s providing easier access to the lake itself. Homes and hotels were built, wood burning steamers carried tourists on the lake, and Canada Lake became a popular resort destination. Most of the cottages that now dot the shores of Canada, and connecting Green, and West Lakes were built in the late 1800s and early 1900s.

References 

Lakes of Fulton County, New York
Lakes of New York (state)